Neue Zeit was the official organ of the Christian Democratic Union of the German Democratic Republic, first published on 22 July 1945. The paper was published on a daily basis. It ceased publication on 5 July 1994.

References

External links

Communist newspapers
Daily newspapers published in Germany
Defunct newspapers published in Germany
Mass media in East Germany
Former state media
German-language newspapers
Newspapers established in 1945
Newspapers published in Berlin
Political newspapers
Publications disestablished in 1994